The 1964 Islington Council election took place on 7 May 1964 to elect members of Islington London Borough Council in London, England. The whole council was up for election and the Labour party gained control of the council.

Background
These elections were the first to the newly formed borough. Previously elections had taken place in the Metropolitan Borough of Finsbury and Metropolitan Borough of Islington. These boroughs were joined to form the new London Borough of Islington by the London Government Act 1963.

A total of 171 candidates stood in the election for the 60 seats being contested across 19 wards. These included a full slate from the Labour party, while the Conservative and Liberal parties stood 55 and 18 respectively. Other candidates included 19 New Liberals, 13 Communists, 1 Independent Communist, 1 Independent Labour, 1 Union Movement and 3 Independent P/Labour. There were 10 three-seat wards, 6 four-seat wards and 3 two-seat wards.

This election had aldermen as well as directly elected councillors.  Labour got all 10 aldermen.

The Council was elected in 1964 as a "shadow authority" but did not start operations until 1 April 1965.

Election result
The results saw Labour gain the new council after winning all 60 seats. Overall turnout in the election was 16.8%. This turnout included 461 postal votes.

Ward results

References

1964
1964 London Borough council elections